Jamal Hill (born February 24, 1995) is an American Paralympic swimmer. He represented the United States at the 2020 Summer Paralympics.

Career
Hill competed in the men's 50 metre freestyle S9 event at the 2020 Summer Paralympics and won a bronze medal.

On April 14, 2022, Hill was named to the roster to represent the United States at the 2022 World Para Swimming Championships.

References

1995 births
Living people
American disabled sportspeople
American male freestyle swimmers
Swimmers from Los Angeles
Paralympic swimmers of the United States
Medalists at the 2019 Parapan American Games
Medalists at the World Para Swimming Championships
Swimmers at the 2020 Summer Paralympics
Medalists at the 2020 Summer Paralympics
Paralympic medalists in swimming
Paralympic bronze medalists for the United States
S10-classified Paralympic swimmers
21st-century American people